Beach of Dreams is a 1921 American silent adventure film directed by William Parke and starring Edith Storey, Noah Beery and Jack Curtis. It is based on the 1919 novel The Beach of Dreams by Henry De Vere Stacpoole.

Plot

Cast
 Edith Storey as Cleo de Bromsart
 Noah Beery as Jack Raft
 Sidney Payne as La Touche
 Jack Curtis as Bompard
 George Fisher as Maurice Chenet
 Josef Swickard as Monsieur de Brie 
 Margarita Fischer as Madame deBrie 
 Templar Powell as Prince Selm 
 Gertrude Norman as La Comtesse de Warens
 Cesare Gravina as Prof. Epnard

References

Bibliography
 St. Romain, Theresa. Margarita Fischer: A Biography of the Silent Film Star. McFarland, 2008.
 Munden, Kenneth White. The American Film Institute Catalog of Motion Pictures Produced in the United States, Part 1. University of California Press, 1997.

External links
 

1921 films
1921 drama films
1920s English-language films
American silent feature films
Silent American drama films
American black-and-white films
Film Booking Offices of America films
Films directed by William Parke
Films based on British novels
Films set in Paris
1920s American films
Films with screenplays by Richard Schayer